Facelina rubrovittata is a species of sea slug, an aeolid nudibranch in the family Facelinidae.

Distribution
This species occurs in the Mediterranean Sea.

References

External links
 

Facelinidae
Gastropods described in 1866
Taxa named by Achille Costa